Papuasicyos is a genus of flowering plants belonging to the family Cucurbitaceae.

Its native range is New Guinea.

Species
Species:

Papuasicyos arfakensis 
Papuasicyos belensis 
Papuasicyos carrii 
Papuasicyos hippocrepicus 
Papuasicyos papuanus 
Papuasicyos parviflorus 
Papuasicyos viridis

References

Cucurbitaceae
Cucurbitaceae genera